Gnaedinger is a surname. Notable people with the surname include:

Angelo Gnaedinger (born 1951), Director-General of the International Committee of the Red Cross 
Mary Gnaedinger (1897–1976), American magazine editor

See also
Gnädinger (disambiguation)